Andrew Nuttall (born 7 September 1957) is a New Zealand cricketer. He played in 19 first-class and 10 List A matches for Canterbury between 1977 and 1990. In February 2020, he was named in New Zealand's squad for the Over-50s Cricket World Cup in South Africa. However, the tournament was cancelled during the third round of matches due to the COVID-19 pandemic.

References

External links
 

1957 births
Living people
New Zealand cricketers
Canterbury cricketers
Place of birth missing (living people)